Laura Donnelly (born 24 June 1982) is a Northern Irish actress. She is the recipient of a Laurence Olivier Award as well as a nomination for a Tony Award. On television, she is known for her roles in the Starz series Outlander (2014–2017), the ITV series Beowulf (2016), and the HBO series The Nevers (2021–2023).

Early life and education
Donnelly grew up in Belfast, Northern Ireland, and graduated from the Royal Scottish Academy of Music and Drama in 2004.

Career
She made her on-screen debut in 2005 in the Channel 4 drama Sugar Rush. She is also known for appearing in Outlander, Britannia, The Fall, for her lead role as Amalia True in HBO's The Nevers (2021), and as a main character in the Irish film Insatiable (2008). 

In April 2018 she won the Best Actress award at the Olivier Awards for her performance in The Ferryman. In 2019 she was nominated for a Tony Award for Best Actress for the same role on Broadway.

Personal life

She lives in London with her partner Jez Butterworth and their two daughters.

Filmography

Film

Television

Theatre 

The Ferryman, Caitlin Carney - Bernard B. Jacobs Theatre - Broadway (director: Sam Mendes)
The Ferryman, Caitlin Carney - Royal Court Theatre / Gielgud Theatre (director: Sam Mendes)
The Wasp, Heather - Trafalgar Studios (director: Tom Attenborough)
The River, Other Woman - Circle In The Square - Broadway (director: Ian Rickson)
Tutto Bene Mamma?, The Women - The Print Room (director: Ewan Marshall)
The River, Other Woman - Royal Court Theatre (director: Ian Rickson)
Philadelphia, Here I Come!, Katie Doogan - Donmar Warehouse (director: Lyndsey Turner)
Judgement Day, Anna - Almeida (director: James McDonald)
Romeo & Juliet, Juliet - Regent's Park Open Air Theatre (director: Timothy Sheader)
A Midsummer Night's Dream, Hermia - Regent's Park Open Air Theatre (director: Dominic Leclerc)
Dancing at Lughnasa, Chrissie - Lyric Theatre Belfast (director: Mick Gordon)
A Boston Marriage, Catherine - B*Spoke/Project Theatre Dublin

Awards and nominations

References

External links 
 
 

1982 births
Living people
Television actresses from Northern Ireland
Stage actresses from Northern Ireland
Alumni of the Royal Conservatoire of Scotland
Actresses from Belfast
People educated at Rathmore Grammar School
21st-century actresses from Northern Ireland
British Shakespearean actresses
Shakespearean actresses from Northern Ireland